Susana Rodríguez may refer to:

Susana Rodríguez (artist) (born 1980), Mexican visual artist
Susana Rodríguez (paratriathlete) (born 1988), Spanish paratriathlete and sprinter